Empire of the Ants is a video game released in 2000, developed by Microïds, and based on a novel of the same name written by Bernard Werber.

Gameplay
The game is playable on a network with up to 8 players, and the game contains more than 60 species of insects and different animals. Requiring strategy and management, it is set in the combative world of ants and their anthills.

Reception

The game received "mixed" reviews according to the review aggregation website Metacritic. Dan Adams, in reviewing the game for IGN, concluded the game has the potential but criticized the lack of characters and poor graphics.

References

External links 
 Empire of the Ants at Microïds

2000 video games
Biological simulation video games
Multiplayer video games
Real-time strategy video games
Strategy First games
Video games about insects
Video games based on novels
Video games developed in France
Windows games
Windows-only games
Microïds games
Video games about ants